Britney Simpson (born May 5, 1996) is an American pair skater. With current partner Matthew Blackmer, she is the 2011 Junior Grand Prix Final bronze medalist, the 2012 U.S. Junior silver medalist and the 2013 U.S. Junior Champion. With former partner Nathan Miller, she is the 2010 U.S. junior silver medalist.

Career 
Simpson was born in Denver, Colorado, and teamed up with Nathan Miller in April 2008. Their partnership ended in 2011.

Simpson teamed up with Blackmer in February 2011 after Miller's retirement. They train in Colorado Springs under coach Dalilah Sappenfield.

In the 2011–2012 season, Simpson and Blackmer won gold at their first Junior Grand Prix event, 2011 JGP Poland, and silver at their second event, 2011 JGP Estonia. They won the bronze medal at the 2011–2012 Junior Grand Prix Final. They competed at the 2012 World Junior Championships and finished 10th.

Programs

With Blackmer

Competitive highlights

With Blackmer

With Miller

References

External links 

 
 Britney Simpson / Matthew Blackmer at Icenetwork
 

1996 births
Living people
American female pair skaters
Figure skaters from Colorado Springs, Colorado
20th-century American women
21st-century American women